Towney Lock is a lock on the Kennet and Avon Canal, between Aldermaston Wharf and Sulhamstead, Berkshire, England.

Towney Lock was built between 1718 and 1723 under the supervision of the engineer John Hore of Newbury. The canal is administered by the Canal & River Trust.

The lock was deepened during restoration work in the 1970s when Ufton Lock was removed.

References

See also

Locks on the Kennet and Avon Canal

Locks on the Kennet and Avon Canal
Locks of Berkshire